Sachiko Morisawa (born 1945) is a former international table tennis player from Japan.

Table tennis career
From 1967 to 1969, she won several medals in singles, doubles, and team events in the World Table Tennis Championships and in the Asian Table Tennis Championships.

The four World Championship medals  included treble gold in the singles, doubles and team at the 1967 World Table Tennis Championships. Her doubles partner was Saeko Hirota.

See also
 List of table tennis players
 List of World Table Tennis Championships medalists

References

External links
Sachiko Morisawa (the second photograph) / Ryokuseikai (Alumni Association of Senshu University Table Tennis Team 

1945 births
Japanese female table tennis players
Living people
Asian Games medalists in table tennis
Table tennis players at the 1966 Asian Games
Asian Games gold medalists for Japan
Asian Games bronze medalists for Japan
Medalists at the 1966 Asian Games